The Fifth Season (stylized in all caps) is the debut Korean studio album (second overall) by South Korean girl group Oh My Girl. It was released on May 8, 2019 by WM Entertainment and distributed by Kakao M. The album contains 10 songs, including the title track "The Fifth Season (SSFWL)" and its instrumental.

A reissue titled Fall in Love was released on August 5, 2019, with the lead single "Bungee (Fall in Love)" and its music video released the same date.

Release and promotion
On April 11, 2019, Oh My Girl's agency WM Entertainment revealed that the group has been preparing for a comeback planned for early May. During the Everyday Miracle fanmeet held on April 20, it was announced that the upcoming release would be their debut full length album releasing on May 8.

A press showcase was held in the evening of May 8 to commemorate the release of the new record. The Fifth Season is the group's second studio album overall, released in "Drawing" and "Photography" versions, differing in only its cover artwork. The day after the album's official release, Oh My Girl had their comeback stage for The Fifth Season on the music program M Countdown, performing both "The Fifth Season (SSFWL)" and "Shower" on television for the first time. Oh My Girl received music show awards for "The Fifth Season (SSFWL)" on The Show and Show Champion on May 14 and 15 respectively. The award for the May 16 edition of M Countdown was initially awarded to NU'EST before a statement was released admitting an error regarding point calculation and was awarded to Oh My Girl the following week.

On July 24, WM Entertainment announced that the album would be re-released on August 5, 2019, with two new tracks: "Bungee (Fall in Love)", and "Tropical Love". On August 8, 2019, the group began performing "Bungee (Fall in Love)" on music shows.

Commercial performance
The album debuted at number 4 on South Korea's Weekly Gaon Album Chart and at number 16 on the Monthly Gaon Album Chart, selling 21,203 by the end of May. The title track also peaked at number 26 on the Gaon Digital Chart and at number 7 on the Gaon Download Chart.

Track listing

Charts

References

Oh My Girl albums
2019 albums
Korean-language albums
Kakao M albums